Cartoon Network (often abbreviated as CN) is an American cable television channel owned by Warner Bros. Discovery. It is a part of The Cartoon Network, Inc., a division that also has the broadcasting and production activities of Boomerang, Cartoonito, Adult Swim, and Toonami under its purview. The channel is headquartered at 1050 Techwood Drive NW in Atlanta, Georgia.

Founded by Ted Turner (who appointed Betty Cohen as the first president of the network), the channel was launched on October 1, 1992, and primarily broadcasts animated television series, mostly children's programming, ranging from action to animated comedy. It currently runs from 6 a.m. - 8 p.m. ET/PT (the sign-off time varies with holidays and special programming). Cartoon Network primarily targets children aged 6–14, while its early morning Cartoonito block is aimed at preschoolers and kindergarteners aged 2–6, and nighttime block Adult Swim targets older teenagers and young adults aged 18–34.

Cartoon Network offers an alternate Spanish-language audio feed, either via a separate channel with the English audio track removed as part of a package of Spanish-language television networks sold by subscription providers, or a separate audio track accessible through the SAP option, depending on the provider.

As of March 2021, Cartoon Network is available to approximately 94 million paid television households in the United States.

History

On August 9, 1986, Turner Broadcasting System acquired Metro-Goldwyn-Mayer/United Artists. On October 18, Turner forcibly sold back MGM. However, Turner kept much of the film and television library made before May 1986 (including some of the UA library) and formed Turner Entertainment Co. On October 8, 1988, its cable channel Turner Network Television was launched and gained an audience with its extensive film library. In 1991, Turner also purchased the library of animation studio Hanna-Barbera. Ted Turner selected Betty Cohen (then-Senior Vice President of TNT) to devise a network to house these programs. On February 18, 1992, Turner Broadcasting announced its plans to launch Cartoon Network as an outlet for an animation library. On October 1, 1992, the network officially launched as the first 24-hour single-genre cable channel with animation as its main theme. The continuity announcers would call it "The Cartoon Network," until 1995, when it was simply dubbed Cartoon Network as it is today.

In 1994, Hanna-Barbera's new division Cartoon Network Studios was founded and started production on What a Cartoon!. This show debuted in 1995, offering original animated shorts. In 1996, Cartoon Network aired two preschool programs: Big Bag, a live-action/puppet television program with animated short series produced by Children's Television Workshop, and Small World, which featured animated series aimed at preschoolers imported from foreign countries. Turner Broadcasting System merged with Time Warner, which consolidated/reverted ownership of all the Warner Bros. cartoons. The network could then continue more original productions.

Programming

Cartoon Network's current original programming includes such shows as 
The Amazing World of Gumball, Craig of the Creek, Teen Titans Go!, and We Baby Bears. The network's original programming is produced at Cartoon Network Studios, while other shows have either been co-produced with or acquired from other studios, including the affiliated Warner Bros. Animation. In the past, Cartoon Network has also produced and aired live-action and animated hybrid programming.

Over the years, Cartoon Network has aired various Looney Tunes, Merrie Melodies, Tom and Jerry and Droopy shorts in constant rotation, dating back to the network's launch in 1992 until 2017. In its early days, Cartoon Network benefited from having access to a large collection of animated programming, including the libraries of Warner Bros. (Looney Tunes and Merrie Melodies), Metro-Goldwyn-Mayer (Tom and Jerry), and Hanna-Barbera (The Flintstones, Scooby-Doo, Snorks). Turner's ownership of Hanna-Barbera gave the network access to an established animation studio, something its rivals didn't have. Most of these series were removed by 1999 and moved to Boomerang in 2000.

Original series

Much of Cartoon Network's original programming originates from the network's in-house studio, Cartoon Network Studios. Beginning as a division of Hanna-Barbera, this studio would produce some of the network's earliest original series, including Dexter's Laboratory, Cow and Chicken, I Am Weasel, Johnny Bravo, and The Powerpuff Girls. Cartoon Cartoons was once the branding for Cartoon Network's original animated television series, but it was seldom used by the network by 2003. The name was eventually discontinued in 2008. Additionally several of the Cartoon Network's original series have been produced by studios other than the network's own in-house studio. Notable examples of this being Ed, Edd n Eddy, Courage the Cowardly Dog, and Codename: Kids Next Door. The name was resurrected by the network in 2021, for a new animated shorts program.

Programming blocks
From 1999 to 2003, Cartoon Cartoon Fridays served as the channel's flagship block, featuring premieres of Cartoon Network original series that fell under the Cartoon Cartoons branding; from 2003 to 2007, the block was renamed to "Fridays" after Cartoon Network began to phase out the Cartoon Cartoons branding. The Toonami block, which originally ran from 1997 to 2008, primarily carried action-oriented series aimed towards an older youth and teen audience, including imported anime series; it was later re-launched under the auspices of Adult Swim in 2012. 2008 saw the introduction of CN Real, a block that featured live-action reality television series aimed towards a youth audience. In 2011, the channel introduced DC Nation, a block that would be focused on series adapted from DC Comics properties.

In September 2021, Cartoon Network introduced new blocks oriented towards preschool and family viewing respectively, as part of an effort under new head Tom Ascheim to broaden the channel's demographic reach. Both blocks debuted in September 2021, and consisted of the new preschool block Cartoonito, and the new Sunday-evening block ACME Night–which primarily carries family films and library content, as well as other original series, specials, and television films from Warner Bros. Animation.

Editing of theatrical cartoon shorts 
Cartoon Network has, during its history, broadcast most of the Warner Bros. animated shorts originally created between the 1920s and the 1960s, but the network edited out scenes depicting discharge of gunfire, alcohol ingestion, cowboys and Indians gags, tobacco, and politically incorrect humor. The unedited versions were kept from both broadcasting and wide release on the video market. Coal Black and de Sebben Dwarfs (1943), a politically incorrect but critically well-regarded short, was notably omitted entirely, while The Scarlet Pumpernickel (1950) and Feed the Kitty (1952), both well-regarded, had their finales heavily edited due to violence.

There was media attention in June 2001 over a network decision concerning further omissions from broadcasting. Cartoon Network formerly scheduled a 49-hour-long marathon annually known as June Bugs, promising to broadcast every Bugs Bunny animated short in chronological order. The network originally intended to include 12 shorts for its 2001 airing of the marathon (one of them part of the Censored Eleven list of Merrie Melodies and Looney Tunes cartoons effectively shelved from distribution) that had become controversial for using ethnic and national stereotypes, albeit broadcasting them past midnight to ensure few children were watching, with introductions concerning their historic value as representatives of another time. The network's corporate parent considered it likely that there would be complaints concerning racial insensitivity. This led to all 12 being omitted in their entirety. Laurie Goldberg, vice-president of public relations, defended the decision, stating, "We're the leader in animation, but we're also one of the top-rated general entertainment networks. There are certain responsibilities that come with that."

Related brands and units

Cartoonito 

Cartoonito is a preschool programming brand owned by Warner Bros.; the brand was first launched in 2006 for use in international markets. In February 2021, it was announced that Cartoonito would make its U.S. debut as a block on Cartoon Network and as a content brand on HBO Max; the Cartoon Network block launched on September 13, 2021.

Adult Swim 

Adult Swim (often stylized as [adult swim] or [as]) is the adult-oriented programming brand of Cartoon Network. The programs featured on Adult Swim are geared toward a mature audience, in contrast to the all-ages, preteen daytime programming of Cartoon Network. As a result, Adult Swim is treated by Nielsen as a separate network in its ratings reports (similar to Nickelodeon's Nick at Nite block) and marketed as such because of its differing target demographics. The block broadcasts both animated and live-action shows (including original programming, syndicated 20th Television shows, and Japanese anime) generally with minimal or no editing for content.

Adult Swim is usually broadcast from 9:00 p.m. to 6:00 a.m. ET/PT in the United States. Its start time was moved up an hour to 8pm on March 31, 2014, though the 8pm hour has been given back to Cartoon Network on numerous occasions. Such occasions include the premieres of Adventure Time: Stakes in 2015, the final season of Regular Show in 2016, new episodes from the sixth season of The Amazing World of Gumball in 2018, and the first ten episodes of Steven Universe Future in 2019.

Toonami 

Toonami (a portmanteau of "cartoon" and "tsunami", suggesting a "tidal wave" of animated cartoons) is a brand used for action-oriented programming blocks and television channels worldwide. The original program block launched on Cartoon Network in the United States on March 17, 1997, and primarily aired both American cartoons and Japanese anime. The block would end its original run on September 20, 2008, before it was later revived on May 26, 2012, as a relaunch of Adult Swim's Saturday night anime block. Toonami's current incarnation is similar to that of the "Midnight Run", a special version of the block that originally ran on Saturday nights and was the forerunner for Adult Swim. The block is best known for its branding and aesthetic, including its animated host, a robot named TOM, that was later voiced by Steven Blum.

The Toonami brand was also used internationally for dedicated networks in the United Kingdom (replacing CNX), Asia (in December 2012), India (in February 2015), and France (in February 2016).

Boomerang 

Boomerang is a brand dedicated to classic and theatrical cartoons aimed towards children 7–13. It was originally a weekend programming block that aired on Cartoon Network from December 8, 1992, until October 3, 2004. On April 1, 2000, Boomerang received a new look and was spun off into its own cable channel. In 2017, an online Boomerang video-on-demand service was launched, which includes classic series along with new episodes of original series like Scooby-Doo and Guess Who?, New Looney Tunes, and The Tom and Jerry Show.

Other services

Production studios

Cartoon Network Studios

Cartoon Network Studios is a production studio located in the network's West Coast headquarters of Burbank, California, which serves as the network's first animation studio division to provide original programs for the network. While the studio makes original programs for the network, original Cartoon Network and Cartoonito shows like The Moxy Show, Big Bag, Ed, Edd n Eddy, Mike, Lu & Og, Courage the Cowardly Dog, Sheep in the Big City, Codename: Kids Next Door, The Secret Saturdays, and Sunday Pants were all co-produced by the network itself without the studio.

Williams Street

Williams Street Productions is the adult production studio division that provides original program to the network's late-night program Adult Swim that is located in Atlanta, Georgia, along with the main headquarters of the network.

Hanna-Barbera Studios Europe

Hanna-Barbera Studios Europe (formerly known as Cartoon Network Development Studio Europe until 2017 and Cartoon Network Studios Europe until 2021) is the network's European production studio division that is located in London, England, which provides other original programs but from the United Kingdom.

Cartoon Network Productions
Cartoon Network Productions is the global distribution arm for shows, pilots, and movies through various international Cartoon Network channels since December 5, 1993. It also works in place for live-action productions (under pseudonyms: Alive and Kicking, Inc., Rent Now Productions and Factual Productions).

CN LA Original Productions
Cartoon Network Latin America Original Productions (abbreviated as CN LA) is a production studio division of the network's Latin American station, formed on May 26, 2019.

Media

Cartoon Network Games 

Cartoon Network Games (formerly Cartoon Network Interactive) is the video game developer and publisher of video games based on Cartoon Network shows since 2000.

Cartoon Network Enterprises 
Cartoon Network Enterprises is the network's global licensing and merchandising arm established in 2001. It distributes merchandises of various Cartoon Network brands such as The Powerpuff Girls, Ben 10, We Bare Bears, Steven Universe, Adventure Time, and more.

Mobile app 
Cartoon Network has a mobile app that provides the latest full episodes, a live stream from the East and West coast, games, and the network's schedule.

Book licensing 
Cartoon Network Books is the book publisher established in 2015. it licencing books based of various Cartoon Network franchises such as The Powerpuff Girls, Adventure Time, Ben 10, Uncle Grandpa, We Bare Bears, Steven Universe, and many more.

Video games 

In 2011, Cartoon Network characters were featured in a four-player mascot brawler fighting game similar to Nintendo's Super Smash Bros. video game series called Cartoon Network: Punch Time Explosion for the Nintendo 3DS. The game was later released for the Xbox 360, PlayStation 3 and the Wii as Cartoon Network Punch Time Explosion XL. Several video games based on the cartoon series Ben 10 were released by Cartoon Network as well. The Cartoon Network website also features various browser games incorporating characters from various Cartoon Network franchises. One such game was FusionFall, a massive multiplayer game released on January 14, 2009, and shut down on August 29, 2013.

Movies 

Cartoon Network Movies is a film production unit of Cartoon Network. It produces films based on various Cartoon Network shows, as well as the other adaptations and the original live-action and animated projects. Their only three animated films released in theaters are The Powerpuff Girls Movie, Aqua Teen Hunger Force Colon Movie Film for Theaters, and Teen Titans Go! To the Movies.

Online 

Cartoon Network registered its official website, CartoonNetwork.com, on January 9, 1996. It officially launched on July 27, 1998. Sam Register served as the site's Senior Vice President and Creative Director from 1997 to 2001. In its early years, small studios partnered with the network to produce exclusive "Web Premiere Toons", short cartoons made specifically for CartoonNetwork.com. More about animation was included in the "Department of Cartoons", which featured storyboards, episode guides, backgrounds, sound and video files, model sheets, production notes, and other information about shows on the network. In January 1999, the Department of Cartoons showcased the "MGM Golden Age Collection", most of which had not been published or even seen in more than 50 years. Cartoon Network launched Cartoon Orbit, an online gaming network characterized by digital trading cards called "cToons", in October 2000. The game officially ended on October 16, 2006.

In October 2000, CartoonNetwork.com outdid its rival Nickelodeon's website in terms of unique users, scoring 2.12 million compared to Nick.com's 1.95 million. In July 2007, Nielsen ratings data showed visitors spent an average of 77 minutes on the site, surpassing the previous record of 71 minutes set in 2004, and the site ranked 26th in terms of time spent for all US domains.

Marketing 
Cartoon Network shows with established fan followings, such as Dexter's Laboratory, allowed the network to pursue licensing agreements with companies interested in selling series-related merchandise. For example, agreements with Kraft Foods led to widespread in-store advertising for Cartoon Network-related products. The network also worked on cross-promotion campaigns with both Kraft and Tower Records. In product development and marketing, the network has benefited from its relation to corporate parent Warner Bros. Discovery, allowing for mutually beneficial relationships with various subsidiary companies.

Time Warner Cable, the former cable television subsidiary of the corporate parent (which was spun off from Time Warner in 2009), distributes Cartoon Network as part of its packages. Turner Broadcasting System, the subsidiary overseeing various Warner Bros. Discovery-owned networks, helped cross-promote Cartoon Network shows and at times arranged for swapping certain shows between the networks. For example, Foster's Home for Imaginary Friends, one of CN's original shows, was at times seen at Kids' WB (which was discontinued on May 24, 2008), while Xiaolin Showdown and ¡Mucha Lucha!, two of Kids' WB's original shows, were seen at Cartoon Network. In each case, the swap intended to cultivate a shared audience for the two networks. Time Inc., the former subsidiary overseeing the magazines of the corporate parent, ensured favorable coverage of Cartoon Network and advertising space across its publications. Printed advertisements for CN shows could appear in magazines such as Time, Entertainment Weekly and Sports Illustrated Kids until Time Inc. was spun off from WarnerMedia on June 9, 2014. AOL, a now-former sibling company to WarnerMedia covering Internet services, helped promote Cartoon Network shows online by offering exclusive content for certain animated series, online sweepstakes and display advertising for CN.

Warner Bros. Home Entertainment, the home video subsidiary, distributes VHS tapes, DVDs and Blu-ray Discs featuring Cartoon Network shows. Select Warner Bros. Family Entertainment VHS releases came with bonus cartoons from Cartoon Network. Rhino Entertainment, the former record label subsidiary of the corporate parent (which was spun off from Warner Bros. Discovery in 2004), distributed cassette tapes and CDs with Cartoon Network-related music. These products were also available through the Warner Bros. Studio Store. DC Comics, the comic book subsidiary, published a series featuring the Powerpuff Girls, indicating it could handle other CN-related characters. Warner Bros., the film studio subsidiary, released The Powerpuff Girls Movie in 2002. Kevin Sandler considered it likely that this film would find its way to HBO or Cinemax, two television network subsidiaries which regularly broadcast feature films. Sandler also viewed book tie-ins through Warner Books as likely, since it was the only area of marketing not covered yet by 2001.

International channels

Since its inception, Cartoon Network and its sister channels have set up various national and regional feeds. Since the early 1990s and 2000s, the network has expanded to countries including Canada, Mexico, Latin America, the United Kingdom, Ireland, Africa, and several Asia-Pacific regions.

See also

 Boomerang
 Cartoonito
 Tooncast

References

Bibliography

External links

 

 
Children's television networks in the United States
Television channels and stations established in 1992
English-language television stations in the United States
Companies based in Atlanta
Companies based in New York City
Warner Bros. Discovery networks
Television networks in the United States
American companies established in 1992
1996 mergers and acquisitions